The Kozara Offensive (also known as Operation West-Bosnien) was fought in 1942 on and around the mountain of Kozara in northwestern Bosnia. It was an important battle of the Yugoslav Partisan resistance movement in World War II. It later became an integral part of Yugoslav post-war mythology, which celebrated the courage and martyrdom of outnumbered and outgunned Partisans and civilians. Certain sources mistakenly identify the Kozara Offensive as part of Operation Trio.

Operation
In the spring of 1942, Yugoslav Partisans in central and west Bosnia liberated Bosanski Petrovac, Drvar, Glamoč and Prijedor. On 20 May the 1st Krajina Assault Brigade was founded, and the next day it obtained tanks and a modest air force. The free territory stretched from the river Sava south across the mountains Kozara and Grmeč. During the winter, Partisans inflicted heavy casualties on the Germans. A great loss for the Partisans was the death of their capable and distinguished commander, Mladen Stojanović, known as "Komandant Mladen". 

The German and Ustaše authorities realized that the city of Banja Luka and the iron mine in Ljubija were in danger and organized an offensive to destroy the movement. The Germans engaged 15,000 soldiers, the Independent State of Croatia about 21,000 soldiers, and the Hungarians participated with 5 monitor ships. The Partisan group had about 3,000 soldiers.

After an intensive battle on the night of 3 July, some partisan units broke the siege, but the main group again came under siege the next night and was mostly destroyed. In Široka Luka about 500 wounded Partisans were killed. It is estimated that during the battle, the Partisans lost about 1,700 soldiers, while the Axis forces lost about 7,000. During and after the battle, many thousands of Serbian civilians from Kozara were sent to the Ustaše Jasenovac concentration camp. About 900 Partisan soldiers survived and founded the Fifth Krajina Brigade. At the same time, the main Partisan group with Josip Broz Tito moved from East Bosnia to West Bosnia. After the Axis offensive forces withdrew, parts of the lost area were regained in September 1942. Approximately 25,000 Serbs were killed in the operation, mostly in concentration camps. 
During German military operation large group of mostly civilians was captured, 10,000 of them were brought from Kozara to Sajmište concentration camp.

See also
 Yugoslav Partisans
 World War II in Yugoslavia
 Army of the Independent State of Croatia
 Military history of Croatia
 Resistance during World War II
 Anti-partisan operations in World War II
 Kozara National Park
 Kozara (film), 1962 Yugoslav partisan film

Footnotes

References

Further reading
 

Conflicts in 1942
Yugoslavia in World War II
Kozara, Battle of
Kozara, Battle of
Kozara, Battle of
1942 in Yugoslavia
Battles and operations of World War II involving Hungary
Battles involving the Independent State of Croatia
June 1942 events
August 1942 events